Pier Luigi Cherubino Loggi (born 15 October 1971), known simply as Pier, is a Spanish former professional footballer who played as a striker, currently a manager.

Over ten seasons, he amassed La Liga totals of 227 games and 54 goals in representation of four clubs, mainly Tenerife.

Playing career

Club
Born in Rome, Italy, Pier was raised in Puerto de la Cruz, Tenerife, and made his professional debut with CD Tenerife's first team during the 1990–91 season. In 16 La Liga matches he scored one goal, in a 1–1 away draw against Real Betis on 6 January 1991, and would be relatively used in the subsequent three campaigns, also appearing in the 1993–94 UEFA Cup.

Pier would develop into a top-flight attacking player in 1994–95, with Sporting de Gijón, and in his two seasons at Betis, where he formidably teamed up with former Real Madrid's Alfonso – the pair combined for 60 league goals from 1995 to 1997, finishing fourth in the latter season.

After failing to produce at Real Zaragoza, Pier returned to Tenerife, where he achieved a top-tier promotion when the team was coached by Rafael Benítez, and also played for six months in CF Extremadura alongside former Atlético Madrid great Kiko.

Pier retired in 2007 at nearly 36, after three seasons in the lower leagues.

International
Pier made his debut (his only match) for the Spain national team on 12 October 1994, in an away UEFA Euro 1996 qualifier against Macedonia, coming on as a substitute for Julio Salinas who had scored both goals in a 2–0 win.

Coaching career
In October 2018, Pier was appointed at UD Granadilla Tenerife of the Spanish Primera División (women). He resigned the following May, having taken them to an all-time best fourth-place finish.

On 29 December 2019, Pier returned to Betis by taking the helm of the women's team until the end of the season.

Honours
Spain U21
UEFA European Under-21 Championship third place: 1994

See also
List of Spain international footballers born outside Spain

References

External links

Betisweb stats and bio 

1971 births
Living people
Footballers from Puerto de la Cruz
Italian emigrants to Spain
Spanish footballers
Footballers from Rome
Association football forwards
La Liga players
Segunda División players
Segunda División B players
Tercera División players
CD Tenerife players
Sporting de Gijón players
Real Betis players
Real Zaragoza players
CF Extremadura footballers
Terrassa FC footballers
RSD Alcalá players
Spain youth international footballers
Spain under-21 international footballers
Spain international footballers
Spanish football managers
Primera División (women) managers
Real Betis non-playing staff